Charlie Young is a fictional character on the TV series The West Wing

Charlie Young may also refer to:
Charlie Young (baseball) (1893–1952), baseball player
Charlie Young (footballer, born 1877) (1877–1949), Australian rules football player for Melbourne
Charlie Young (footballer, born 1918) (1918–1969), Australian rules football player for Fitzroy
Charlie Young (actress) (born 1974), Taiwanese actress and singer

See also
Charley Young (born 1952), American football running back
Charle Young (born 1951), American football tight end
Charles Young (disambiguation)